In telecommunications, Multiprotocol Label Switching - Transport Profile (MPLS-TP) is a variant of the MPLS protocol that is used in packet switched data networks.  MPLS-TP is the product of a joint Internet Engineering Task Force (IETF) / International Telecommunication Union Telecommunication  Standardization Sector (ITU-T) effort to include an MPLS Transport Profile within the IETF MPLS and PWE3 architectures to support the capabilities and functionalities of a packet transport network.

Description

MPLS-TP is designed for use as a network layer technology in transport networks. It will be a continuation of the work started by the transport network experts of the ITU-T, specifically SG15, as T-MPLS. Since 2008 the work is progressed in a cooperation between ITU-T and IETF. The required protocol extensions to MPLS being designed by the IETF based on requirements provided by service providers. It will be a connection-oriented packet-switched (CO-PS) application. It will offer a dedicated MPLS implementation by removing features that are not relevant to CO-PS applications and adding mechanisms that provide support of critical transport functionality.

MPLS-TP is to be based on the same architectural principles of layered networking that are used in longstanding transport network technologies like SDH, SONET and OTN. Service providers have already developed management processes and work procedures based on these principles.

MPLS-TP gives service providers a reliable packet-based technology that is based upon circuit-based transport networking, and thus is expected to align with current organizational processes and large-scale work procedures similar to other packet transport technologies.

MPLS-TP is a low cost L2.5 technology (if the limited profile to be specified is implemented in isolation) that provides QoS, end-to-end OA&M and protection switching.

In February 2008 the ITU-T and IETF agreed to work jointly
on the design of MPLS-TP. Based on this agreement IETF and ITU-T experts will jointly work out the requirements and solutions. ITU-T in turn will update the existing T-MPLS standards based on the MPLS-TP related RFCs listed below.

ITU-T

The following ITU-T Recommendations exist for MPLS-TP. Some of those Recommendations are superseding the ones that applied to T-MPLS before this work was ceased.

RFC or drafts
The following IETF RFCs or drafts exist for MPLS-TP:

Solutions
The solutions for the above requirements and framework are as mentioned below and is under development:
  An In-Band Data Communication Network For the MPLS Transport Profile
  MPLS Generic Associated Channel- Defines GAL/G-ACH
  "EXP field" renamed to "Traffic Class field"
  MPLS Transport Profile Lock Instruct and Loopback Functions
  A Thesaurus for the Interpretation of Terminology Used in MPLS Transport Profile (MPLS-TP) Internet-Drafts and RFCs in the Context of the ITU-T's Transport Network Recommendation
 MPLS-TP ACH TLV (IETF Draft)
 Proactive continuity and connectivity verification (Individual Draft)
  Guidelines for the Use of the "OAM" Acronym in the IETF
 MPLS-TP OAM based on Y.1731 (Individual Draft)
 MPLS-TP Performance monitoring (Individual Draft)
  MPLS Fault Management Operations, Administration, and Maintenance (OAM)
  MPLS Transport Profile (MPLS-TP) Linear Protection
  Pre-standard Linear Protection Switching in MPLS Transport Profile (MPLS-TP)
 MPLS-TP P2MP traffic protection (Individual Draft) 
 MPLS-TP OAM Alarm suppression (Individual Draft)
 MPLS-TP & IP/MPLS Interworking (Individual Draft)
 MPLS-TP Ring Protection (Individual Draft)
 MPLS-TP LDP extension: No work
 MPLS-TP RSVP-TE extensions: No work

References

External links 
 ITU-T series G recommendations
 IETF MPLS Charter
 MPLS-TP Mailing list archives
 Current mailing list (back to MPLS mailing list)
 Latest list of MPLS-TP standards

MPLS networking
Internet Standards
Network protocols
Tunneling protocols